Mlinsko is a small settlement on the right bank of the Soča River just outside Kobarid in the Littoral region of Slovenia.

References

External links
Mlinsko on Geopedia

Populated places in the Municipality of Kobarid